Ady Barkan (born December 18, 1983) is an American lawyer and liberal activist. He is a co-founder of the Be a Hero PAC and is an organizer for the Center for Popular Democracy, where he led the Fed Up campaign. Barkan confronted Senator Jeff Flake on a plane in 2017, asking him to "be a hero" and vote no on a tax bill.

Barkan, who was diagnosed with the terminal neurodegenerative disease ALS (also known as Lou Gehrig's disease) in 2016 shortly after the birth of his son, has been called "the most powerful activist in America" in a headline from 2019 in Politico Magazine. In 2020, he was included on Times list of the 100 most influential people in the world.

Early life and education
Ady Barkan was born December 18, 1983, to immigrant parents from Romania and Israel. Barkan grew up in what he describes as a "secular Jewish household" and holds dual U.S. and Israeli citizenship. He attended high school in Claremont, California, where he took an early interest in progressive activism like the fight against anti-gay rights legislation. Barkan next attended Columbia College, taking courses taught by economists Joseph Stiglitz and Jeffrey Sachs, and graduating cum laude in 2006. He went on to Yale Law School, where he earned his J.D. degree in 2010.

Career

Early career 
Between college and law school, Barkan worked on the campaign of Democrat Victoria Wells Wulsin, serving as communications director for Wulsin's longshot and ultimately unsuccessful effort to win a congressional seat in a strongly Republican area of Cincinnati. Following law school, Barkan lived in New York where he worked on immigrant legal rights, then clerked for Judge Shira Scheindlin on the United States District Court for the Southern District of New York.

Barkan works for the Center for Popular Democracy. Beginning in 2012, he developed the Fed Up campaign to advocate with the Federal Reserve for the impact of monetary policy on low-income people. Organizing protests at the Federal Reserve's annual meeting in Jackson Hole, Wyoming, Fed Up sought to slow the raise of interest rates and more broadly change the governance structure of the Federal Reserve; by 2014, the group was included in the annual meeting's agenda.

Advocacy since ALS diagnosis 

In December 2017, Barkan engaged Republican U.S. Senator Jeff Flake of Arizona about Flake's impending vote on the proposed tax cuts, an exchange captured on video by another activist, Liz Jaff, when they were on the same cross-country flight. Barkan pressed Flake on the PAYGO cuts to Medicare, Medicaid and Social Security that such large tax cuts would trigger, endangering programs that Barkan's disease meant his survival would soon depend on. He pleaded with Flake to "be an American hero" and vote against the tax cuts to ensure that patients like Barkan would not lose access, for instance, to the ventilator Barkan would eventually need to be able to breathe. Flake voted for the cuts. Following that encounter, Barkan developed the Be a Hero campaign that supports a range of progressive causes and candidates.

During the 2018 Supreme Court confirmation hearings of Brett Kavanaugh, in collaboration with the Maine People's Alliance and Mainers for Accountable Leadership, Barkan and the Be a Hero campaign advocated for Republican U.S. Senator Susan Collins of Maine to vote against the nomination; among other issues, Kavanaugh opposed abortion and while Collins had indicated she would not support a nominee who would overturn Roe v. Wade, she nevertheless seemed likely to support the nomination. After making little headway with other means of reaching Collins, Barkan turned to fundraising. The effort sought crowd-funded donations in the amount of $20.20 to back a Democratic challenger to Collins's 2020 reelection campaign in the event that Collins supported Kavanaugh; Barkan used the Crowdpac platform to collect pledges that would have been refunded to donors if Collins voted to oppose Kavanaugh's nomination. She ultimately voted to confirm and the campaign raised $4 million from more than 100,000 donors to fund 2020 challenger Sara Gideon. Gideon was subsequently defeated by Collins.

During the 2018 election cycle, Barkan traveled the country (22 states in 40 days) to talk to voters about healthcare. His healthcare ads were run in over 100 districts across the country and his PAC played a critical role in flipping multiple seats. Ady's ad was nominated alongside Colin Kaepernick's Nike Ad as "most inspiring".

In April 2019, Barkan testified before the United States House Committee on Rules in favor of Medicare for All at the first-ever congressional hearing on the subject. Barkan, who has ALS, used augmentative and alternative communication to testify to the House panel about why he believes America needs single-payer health care.

Barkan is also a national co-chair of Health Care Voter. Barkan was named one of the Top 50 Political Thinkers in 2016 by Politico and in 2018, he was listed in the 50 most influential American Jews by Forward. During the July 2019 debate, Elizabeth Warren mentioned Barkan's struggle as an example of the inadequacies of private insurance. In August, 2019, Barkan had his first interview with a presidential candidate. He spoke with Cory Booker and discussed Booker's plans for healthcare reform. During the interview, they also discussed how it was for Booker to watch his father, who died of Parkinson's, become ill and die.

Barkan's book, Eyes to the Wind: A Memoir of Love and Death, Hope and Resistance, was published in September 2019 by Atria Books. The book was blurbed by Elizabeth Warren and Bernie Sanders and includes a foreword by Alexandria Ocasio-Cortez.

During day 2 of the 2020 Democratic National Convention on August 18, 2020, Barkan gave a speech for his support of the Joe Biden 2020 presidential campaign.

Personal life
Barkan is married to Rachael King, an English professor. King and Barkan, who met as undergraduates at Columbia, have two children: a son, born in 2016, and a daughter, born in 2019. They live in Santa Barbara, California. He is a member of the Democratic Socialists of America.

References

1983 births
Living people
Activists from California
American lawyers
American people of Israeli descent
American people of Romanian-Jewish descent
American political activists
Columbia College (New York) alumni
Members of the Democratic Socialists of America
People from California
People with motor neuron disease
Wheelchair users
Yale Law School alumni